Edrisi-ye Sofla (also Romanized as Edrīsī-ye Soflá; also known as Edrīsī) is a village in Mazu Rural District, Alvar-e Garmsiri District, Andimeshk County, Khuzestan Province, Iran. At the 2006 census, its population was 156, in 38 families.

References 

Populated places in Andimeshk County